Benjamin Drake (November 28, 1794, May's Lick, Kentucky – April 1, 1841, Cincinnati) historian, editor, and writer born to Isaac Drake (1756–1832) and Elizabeth Shotwell (1761–1821). His elder brother was the physician and author Daniel Drake. Benjamin co-founded and for seven years was the editor of the Cincinnati Chronicle.

Literary work
 Cincinnati in 1826.  1827
 The life and adventures of Black Hawk: with sketches of Keokuk, The Sac and Fox Indians, and the late Black Hawk War.  1838
 Tales and sketches, from the Queen City  1838
 Sketches of the civil and military services of William Henry Harrison 1840
 Life of Tecumseh: and of his brother The Prophet; with a historical sketch of the Shawanoe Indians.  1852

Family
Benjamin married Maria Ogden on December 19, 1818, they had seven children: Francis, Elizabeth, Jane, Benjamin, Marie, James Fitch, and George.

References
 familysearch.org Accessed March 2, 2010

External links
 
 
 Benjamin Drake
 Biography of Benjamin Drake

1794 births
1841 deaths
American historians
American newspaper editors
People from Mason County, Kentucky